She-Dick was an American electropop band fronted by a drag trio that was formed in Dallas, Texas in October 2006. The self-proclaimed "female detectives by day and pop-stars by night" sing adult-oriented, innuendo-filled songs about "succulent hot dogs, nasty blowjobs and butter-pecan ice cream."



Biography

Formation 
The germ of inspiration began when three gay men met at the Cedar Springs Block Party, the annual Dallas gay Halloween celebration. The founding members of She-Dick were; Miss Candi Shell, Miss Gloria Hole, Miss Annie Rex and producer, Hans HandiKraft, who began toying with gender roles and creating electropop beats with hyper-sexual, gender-bending themes. In July 2007, Rex left the band and Princess Persia joined the line up.

It wasn't until after She-Dick walked the runway at the DIFFA (Design Industry Fashion For AIDS) 2007 Dallas Collection charity event that things really took off for the band. She-Dick's first live performance was at Rubber Gloves Rehearsal Studios (RGRS) where they performed with touring bands Femme Fatality and Lazer as well as a duet with Teresa Nasty. Next She-Dick opened for gay rapper Cazwell at Minc Lounge, a Dallas nightclub that hosts performances by artists such as Erykah Badu, Kaskade and DJ Tiesto.

Film projects 
So Beautiful is a full feature-length motion picture loosely based on the chaotic and controversial activities of She-Dick at the 2007 DIFFA fashion event. Filmed and produced by Adriana, a Dallas-based independent filmmaker, the film was due to be released in the summer of 2008; however it is awaiting release.

See also 
 Drag queen
 Crossdressing
 Electropop
 Electroclash
 List of transgender-related topics

References

External links 

 Official website
 She-Dick on MySpace

American dance music groups
American drag queens
LGBT-themed musical groups
Queercore groups
Musical groups from Dallas
Drag groups